Portlaoise RFC is an Irish rugby team based in Portlaoise, Leinster, playing in Division 1B of the Leinster League. The club is based just off the N77 in Togher, near the M7 interchange.

References
 

Irish rugby union teams
Rugby clubs established in 1966
Rugby union clubs in County Laois
Sport in Portlaoise